"Is It Love" is a 1986 single by the band Mr. Mister and the third released from Welcome to the Real World. The song peaked at number 8 on the Billboard Hot 100 in June 1986. The song is used during the end credits of the 1987 film Stakeout.

Cash Box said that the song "has Mr. Mister’s distinctive production sheen and the chorus will eventually catch the mass ear."

Track listing
7" Single

"Is It Love" - 3:32
"32" - 4:37

12" Single

"Is It Love (Dance Mix)" - 6:24
"Broken Wings" - 5:45
"Is It Love (Dub Mix)" - 4:12

Charts

References

Mr. Mister songs
1986 songs
1986 singles
Songs written by Steve George (keyboardist)
Songs written by Richard Page (musician)